François M'Pelé (born 13 July 1947) is a Congolese former professional footballer who played as a forward. In 2006, he was selected by CAF as one of the best 200 African football players of the last 50 years.

Career
M'Pelé played professional football in Ligue 1 with Paris Saint-Germain, RC Lens and Stade Rennais F.C. He played for PSG from 1973 to 1979, and as of 2014, was the club's fourth-leading goal-scorer with 97 in all competitions. He is PSG's all-time leading goal-scorer in the Coupe de France with 28 goals.

References

External links

Profile

1947 births
Living people
Sportspeople from Brazzaville
Association football forwards
Africa Cup of Nations-winning players
Republic of the Congo footballers
Republic of the Congo international footballers
1972 African Cup of Nations players
1974 African Cup of Nations players
1978 African Cup of Nations players
Ligue 1 players
AC Ajaccio players
Paris Saint-Germain F.C. players
RC Lens players
Stade Rennais F.C. players
Republic of the Congo expatriate footballers
Expatriate footballers in France
Republic of the Congo expatriate sportspeople in France